Yuzhmashavia (Air Transport Company Yuzmashavia) is an airline based in Dnipro, Ukraine, and was established in 1985. The airline used to be a flying division of Southern Engineering Plant (Yuzhmash), and operated charter passenger and cargo services. 

However, as of 2022 following the Russian invasion of Ukraine, it suspended all operations.

History 
Yuzhmashavia was established as Air Transport Company Yuzmashavia in 1985.

The Yuzmashavia fleet consisted of the following aircraft (at April 2019):
2 Ilyushin Il-76

Yuzmashavia suspended operations in 2022 following the Russian invasion of Ukraine.

References

External links 
 (English)

Airlines of Ukraine
Airlines established in 1985
Yuzhmash
1985 establishments in Ukraine
Companies based in Dnipro